Sphaerites politus, commonly known as the polite beetle, is a species of false clown beetle in the family Sphaeritidae. It is found in North America.

References

Further reading

 

Hydrophiloidea
Beetles of North America
Beetles described in 1846
Taxa named by Carl Gustaf Mannerheim (naturalist)
Articles created by Qbugbot